Liss is the surname of the following people:

Andrzej Liss (1950–2019), Polish politician
David Liss (born 1966), American writer of novels, essays and short fiction
Dmitry Liss (born 1960), Russian music conductor
Johann Liss (c. 1590–1630), German painter
Klaus-Dieter Liss (born 1962), German-Australian physicist
Lesia Liss (born 1966), American politician
Lucas Liss (born 1992), German cyclist
Peter Liss (born 1942), British environmental scientist

Liss is the given name of the following people:

Liss Eriksson (1919–2000), Swedish sculptor
Liss Platt (born 1965), Canadian video artist
Liss Schanche, Norwegian politician